The red-hooded tanager (Piranga rubriceps), is a medium-sized American songbird in the family Cardinalidae, the cardinals or cardinal grosbeaks. It is found in Colombia, Ecuador, and Peru.

Taxonomy and systematics

The red-hooded tanager and the other species of genus Piranga were originally placed in the family Thraupidae, the "true" tanagers. Since approximately 2008 they have been placed in their current family. 

The red-hooded tanager is monotypic.

Description

The male is mostly yellowish overall, with a red hood that extends from the head to the breast. The female is similar, but duller overall, and the red of the head does not extend onto the breast.

Distribution and habitat

The red-hooded tanager is found in the Western, Central, and Eastern Andes of Colombia and on the eastern slope of the Andes south through Ecuador to Peru's Huánuco Province. It inhabits the interior and edges of humid montane forest, especially those heavy with mosses and epiphytes.

Behavior

Feeding

The red-hooded tanager forages by hopping through branches and foliage in the mid- to upper storeys of the forest, often in the open. It travels in pairs or small groups, and about half the time joins mixed-species foraging flocks.

Breeding

A female red-hooded tanager in breeding condition was noted in Colombia's Western Andes in September. No other information about the species' breeding phenology has been published.

Vocalization
The red-hooded tanager's song is "a combination of thin trills, e.g., 'tititititi', interspersed with sweeter, more musical phrases such as 'tswe, weéteetseet-see'" . Another song is rendered "tsee-ee-ee-ee" . Its calls include "spink!" and "tink!" notes .

References

red-hooded tanager
Birds of the Colombian Andes
Birds of the Ecuadorian Andes
Birds of the Peruvian Andes
red-hooded tanager
red-hooded tanager
Taxonomy articles created by Polbot